Lytoneuron is a genus of ferns in the subfamily Cheilanthoideae of the family Pteridaceae. Species are native to South America, many to Brazil.

Species
, the Checklist of Ferns and Lycophytes of the World recognized the following species:
Lytoneuron acutilobum (Prantl) Yesilyurt
Lytoneuron bradei (Rosenst.) Yesilyurt
Lytoneuron crenulans (Fée) Yesilyurt
Lytoneuron feei (Brade) Yesilyurt
Lytoneuron itatiaiense (Fée) Yesilyurt
Lytoneuron lomariaceum (Klotzsch) Yesilyurt
Lytoneuron microphyllum (Christ) Yesilyurt
Lytoneuron ornithopus (Hook.) Yesilyurt
Lytoneuron paradoxum (Fée) Yesilyurt
Lytoneuron quinquelobatum (Fée) Yesilyurt
Lytoneuron rosenstockii (Brade) Yesilyurt
Lytoneuron rufum (Brade) Yesilyurt
Lytoneuron subsimplex (Fée) Yesilyurt
Lytoneuron tijucanum (Brade) Yesilyurt

References

Pteridaceae
Fern genera